Bernd Schuster (born 22 December 1959) is a German former professional footballer of the late 1970s through early 1990s, who won club titles playing for the Spanish sides FC Barcelona (1980–1987) and Real Madrid (1988–1990). He played as a midfielder and was nicknamed "der Blonde Engel" (the Blond Angel). After retiring as a player, he managed a number of European clubs, including Real Madrid, taking them to the league title in the 2007–08 season.

Club career
Schuster started his professional career with 1. FC Köln at age 18 in 1978 after a number of promising performances with the West German Under-18 National team. Schuster left Köln after the 1980 European campaign to sign with Spain's FC Barcelona, where he flourished. During his career, he played for clubs Real Madrid, Atlético Madrid and Bayer Leverkusen. At his final team, the Mexican side Pumas de la UNAM he appeared in ten matches in spring 1997.

Barcelona

Schuster was an important part of the FC Barcelona team during the 1980s, leading the game from midfield and scoring many goals. His club president Josep Lluís Núñez and some trainers like Helenio Herrera, Udo Lattek, Terry Venables and Luis Aragonés had difficult relations with him. He won, however, the European Silver Ball in 1980 and Bronze Ball in 1981 and 1985. At age 21, in 1981, he received a bad injury on his right knee by Athletic Bilbao defender Andoni Goikoetxea.

Real Madrid
Schuster's move to Real Madrid was controversial due to the strong rivalry between Barcelona and Madrid. His style complemented the group of home-grown Madrid players known as la Quinta del Buitre who led the team to a dominance of the Spanish Championship through the 1980s.

Atlético Madrid
Schuster signed with Atlético Madrid in autumn 1990 and helped improve the performance of Atletico's traditional games based on backpasses. His long precise passes helped restore Atlético Madrid as a prominent club.

Bayer Leverkusen
In 1993, Schuster returned home to Germany to play for three seasons with Bayer Leverkusen. Despite his contributions, the club was unable to capture Bundesliga and German Cup titles but his performances inspired much of the country to push for a place for him in the 1994 World Cup squad. In the national TV-Station ARD "Goal of the year" election Schuster won the first three places in 1994. In the UEFA Golden Jubilee Poll to name the finest European players of the last five decades, Schuster finished 40th.

International career
Schuster was part of the West Germany national team that won the 1980 UEFA European Football Championship in Italy, appearing in two of Germany's four matches. His performances there helped him earn the Silver Ball Trophy honour as the Europe's second best player in 1980 behind Golden Ball winner, and Germany team-mate Karl-Heinz Rummenigge. His refusal to take part in a match against Albania to be home for the birth of his second son David caused a sporting scandal at the time. Schuster retired from the German national team at the age of 24, due to his repeated disagreements with the German Football Association, then national team manager Jupp Derwall, and teammates including Paul Breitner. According to Schuster, it was due to a major disagreement with the managements of both Barcelona and the German national team on either side of a friendly match against Brazil. Overall Schuster won 21 caps for the West German national team

Coaching career

Fortuna Köln
Schuster was the coach of Fortuna Köln between 1 July 1997 and 30 June 1998.

1. FC Köln
Schuster was coach of 1. FC Köln from 1 July 1998 to 30 June 1999. Schuster was unable to get the club promoted. In 2000, he applied for the manager job at Scottish club Dundee FC, but the Dundee chairman rejected his application.

Xerez
Schuster became coach of Xerez on 26 June 2001. Schuster coached the team successfully for two seasons. The second and third best seasons in the history of the club. However, he could not get the club promoted to La Liga.

Shakhtar Donetsk
In June 2003, he accepted a deal to coach Shakhtar Donetsk starting on 1 July 2003. Schuster established a club record number of consecutive victories. However, the team did not win the championship and did not reach the final round of the Champions League with a match against Lokomotiv Moscow. Schuster was sacked on 5 May 2004, one week before his team played and won the Ukrainian Cup final in 2004.

Levante
Schuster returned to Spain in summer 2004 to coach Levante. Schuster was sacked on 1 May 2005. The sacking came with a 5-point advantage over the relegation zone with five matches remaining. However, Levante could not win a game and fell to the Segunda División again.

Getafe
Schuster moved to Getafe in the summer of 2005. Schuster led them to their best season in team history under his guidance. Schuster coached Getafe in their second successful season and the team did even better, seventh in La Liga. Getafe also secured entry to the 2007–08 UEFA Cup as a result of reaching the final of the Copa del Rey after overcoming a 5–2 first leg semi-final defeat against Barcelona, beating them 4–0 in the second leg.

Real Madrid
Schuster was appointed coach of Real Madrid on 9 July 2007. As manager, he made a successful start with Real Madrid, taking them to top of the La Liga standings. Attacking football returned again to the Santiago Bernabéu stadium with Madrid having the strongest offence, not beaten at home from the start of the league and defeating their arch rival Barcelona at their home ground Camp Nou, increasing their lead to seven points between them and second place (Barcelona).

The team qualified to the second round of the UEFA Champions League leading their group which contained Olympiacos, Werder Bremen and Lazio. He changed Real Madrid's style of play, switching from the defensive football during the reign of Fabio Capello to fast paced, attacking football. After losing 2–1 to Roma in the second leg of the UEFA Champions League which meant the elimination of Real Madrid, many doubted that Schuster would continue to be Madrid's coach, but the club denied the allegations. On 4 May 2008, Schuster guided Real Madrid to their 31st title with three games to spare.

On 18 May 2008, Schuster's Real Madrid achieved the highest point total (85 points) a record that was set by rivals Barcelona. He went on to win the Supercopa de España. Although enjoying a successful season with Madrid, Schuster had frequent confrontations with the media. Sometimes refusing to answer questions, making controversial or sarcastic statements and walking out of press conferences. On 9 December 2008, Schuster stepped down as coach after a 4–3 defeat to Sevilla FC, and speaking out publicly about his team standing no chance of beating Barcelona (Coached by Pep Guardiola at the time) in the El Clásico derby match. He was replaced by Juande Ramos.

Beşiktaş

On 10 June 2010, Turkish club Beşiktaş announced that Schuster had agreed to become the club's new coach on a two-year contract. Among his first signings for the club were Portuguese winger Ricardo Quaresma, Roberto Hilbert and former Real midfielder Guti, who was coached by Schuster at Madrid. Later he bolstered the squad with three additional Portuguese stars Simão Sabrosa, Hugo Almeida and Manuel Fernandes. Schuster resigned on 15 March 2011 from Beşiktaş after the bad results, having frequent confrontations with the media, making controversial statements and walking out of press conferences. He was criticised by the Turkish media for trying to implement a reckless attacking style of play.

Málaga
Schuster became head coach at Málaga on 12 June 2013. In May 2014 his contract was terminated after he failed to achieve a top-half position in the league.

Dalian Yifang
On 19 March 2018, Chinese Super League team Dalian Yifang officially appointed Schuster as the coach. He was replaced by Choi Kang-hee in 2019.

Personal life
During his time as a player, Schuster and his wife Gaby were celebrities in Germany. Gaby had a controversial reputation, which worsened when she took over the job as her husband's manager. During the Schusters' stay in Spain, she was also notorious for her often public comments directed towards FC Barcelona coach Udo Lattek and national coach Jupp Derwall when her husband played for them. The couple have four children. In 2008, Schuster separated from Gaby Schuster. In 2012, after his divorce, he married Elena Blasco, a Spanish lawyer.

Career statistics

Club

International

Managerial

Honours

Player
Barcelona
 La Liga: 1984–85
 Copa del Rey: 1980–81, 1982–83, 1987–88
 European Cup Winners' Cup: 1981–82
 Copa de la Liga: 1983

Real Madrid
 La Liga: 1988–89, 1989–90
 Copa del Rey: 1988–89
 Supercopa de España: 1989

Atlético Madrid
 Copa del Rey: 1990–91, 1991–92

West Germany
 UEFA European Championship: 1980

Individual
 UEFA European Championship Team of the Tournament: 1980
 Ballon d'Or runner-up: 1980; third place: 1981, 1985
 La Liga: Don Balón Award for Best Foreign Player: 1985, 1991
 kicker Bundesliga Team of the Season: 1993–94
 Goal of the Year (Germany): 1994

Manager
Getafe
 Copa del Rey runner-up: 2006–07

Real Madrid
 La Liga: 2007–08
 Supercopa de España: 2008

Individual
 La Liga: Miguel Muñoz Trophy for Best Coach of the Year: 2006

References

External links

 
 
 
 
 

1959 births
Living people
Sportspeople from Augsburg
Footballers from Bavaria
West German footballers
German footballers
Association football midfielders
FC Augsburg players
1. FC Köln players
FC Barcelona players
Real Madrid CF players
Atlético Madrid footballers
Bayer 04 Leverkusen players
Club Universidad Nacional footballers
Bundesliga players
La Liga players
Liga MX players
Germany youth international footballers
Germany under-21 international footballers
Germany international footballers
UEFA Euro 1980 players
UEFA European Championship-winning players
German expatriate footballers
German expatriate sportspeople in Spain
German expatriate sportspeople in Mexico
Expatriate footballers in Spain
Expatriate footballers in Mexico
German football managers
SC Fortuna Köln managers
1. FC Köln managers
Xerez CD managers
FC Shakhtar Donetsk managers
Levante UD managers
Getafe CF managers
Real Madrid CF managers
Beşiktaş J.K. managers
Málaga CF managers
Dalian Professional F.C. managers
2. Bundesliga managers
Segunda División managers
Ukrainian Premier League managers
La Liga managers
Süper Lig managers
Chinese Super League managers
German expatriate football managers
German expatriate sportspeople in Ukraine
German expatriate sportspeople in Turkey
German expatriate sportspeople in China
Expatriate football managers in Spain
Expatriate football managers in Ukraine
Expatriate football managers in Turkey
Expatriate football managers in China
West German expatriate sportspeople in Spain
West German expatriate footballers